Duke Eugen of Württemberg (20 August 1846 – 27 January 1877) was a German prince and a staff officer of Württemberg.

Early life and family
Duke Eugen was born at Bückeburg, Schaumburg-Lippe, second child and first son of Duke Eugen of Württemberg (1820–1875) (son of Duke Eugen of Württemberg, and Princess Mathilde of Waldeck and Pyrmont) and his wife, Princess Mathilde of Schaumburg-Lippe (1818–1891) (daughter of George William, Prince of Schaumburg-Lippe and Princess Ida of Waldeck and Pyrmont). Eugen grew up in Carlsruhe in Silesia. He studied at the University of Tübingen.

Military career
In 1866 he joined as a lieutenant in the Army of Württemberg. With the 3rd Cavalry Regiment, he took part in the Austro-Prussian War.

Back in September 1866 after the war, until 1870 he leave the military service to continue his studies, he lived for one period in Paris. Together with his uncle, Duke William of Württemberg, he undertook from July 1868 to January 1869 a trip to the United States.

During the Franco-Prussian War of 1870-71, he fought as a lieutenant in the Battles of Mezieres, Chevilly, Mont Mesly and Villiers. In 1871 he became captain, in 1872 he was the 19th (1st Württemberg) Uhlans "King William I". In 1874 he was Major and 1876 staff officer. In December 1876 as a squadron leader Eugene was reassigned for the 2 Westphalian Hussar Regiment No. 11 in Düsseldorf.

Marriage and issue 
Duke Eugen was chosen by Charles I of Württemberg (a distant relative) as a husband for Grand Duchess Vera Konstantinovna of Russia, who was Charles' and Queen Olga's niece and adopted daughter. On 8 May 1874, in Stuttgart, he married Vera (1854–1912), daughter of Grand Duke Konstantin Nikolayevich of Russia and Princess Alexandra of Saxe-Altenburg.

They had three children:
 Duke Charles-Eugen of Württemberg (8 April 1875 – 11 November 1875); died young.
 Duchess Elsa of Württemberg (1 March 1876 – 27 May 1936); married Prince Albrecht of Schaumburg-Lippe (24 October 1869 – 25 December 1942) in 1897.
 Duchess Olga of Württemberg (1 March 1876 – 21 October 1932); married Prince Maximilian of Schaumburg-Lippe (13 March 1871 – 1 April 1904) in 1898.

Death
Eugen died of a sudden illness aged 30. He was buried in the Castle Church in Stuttgart. At the time of his death he was next in the line to the throne of Württemberg after Prince William (later King William II).

Honours

Ancestry

Notes and sources

thePeerage.com - Eugen Herzog von Württemberg
The Royal House of Stuart, London, 1969, 1971, 1976, Addington, A. C., Reference: page 223
L'Allemagne dynastique, Huberty, Giraud, Magdelaine, Reference: vol II page 540.

1846 births
1877 deaths
Military personnel of Württemberg
People from the Kingdom of Prussia
Members of the Prussian House of Lords
Eugen
German military personnel of the Franco-Prussian War
Recipients of the Iron Cross, 2nd class
Military personnel from Lower Saxony